Phil Waller may refer to:
 Phil Waller (rugby union)
 Phil Waller (footballer)

See also
 Philip Waller, English historian